Ewing Miles Brown began his career as an actor in Hollywood. His first role was a small part in the comedy, Our Gang. In the early 1950s he decided to integrate the production domain. He was the head editor in Emperor films and was recruited by Robert L. Lippert studio to take responsibility for production.

Not happy working for others, he opened his own production company, Movie Tech Studio.  Meanwhile, he did not stop his activity as an actor and has contributed to several Hollywood films. He was often called by his nickname, "the Lucky Brown".

He died May 27, 2019, age 97.

As an actor

As a producer

References

External links

Further reading
 Scary Monsters Magazine, January, 2012 no.81 "Lucky Brown Remembers.....The Horror Icons Of Hollywood's Hey day" Part One, massive 15 page interview with Ewing Brown by writers/interviewers Lawrence Fultz Jr. and Paul Parla
 Scary Monsters Magazine 2012 Yearbook, March, 2012 no.20 "Lucky Brown Remembers....More Horror Icons Of Hollywood's Hey day" Part Two, by Lawrence Fultz Jr. and Paul Parla introduction by Anthony DiSalvo

American male film actors
American film producers
Place of birth missing (living people)
Year of birth missing (living people)
Living people